= Niponostenostola niponensis =

Scientific classification
- Kingdom: Animalia
- Phylum: Arthropoda
- Class: Insecta
- Order: Coleoptera
- Suborder: Polyphaga
- Infraorder: Cucujiformia
- Family: Cerambycidae
- Genus: Niponostenostola
- Species: N. niponensis

Binomial name
- Niponostenostola niponensis (Pic, 1901)

Synonyms
- Stenostola niponensis Pic, 1901

Species of beetle

Niponostenostola niponensis is a species of beetle in the family Cerambycidae. It was first described by Maurice Pic in 1901.

== Subspecies ==
- Niponostenostola niponensis niponensis (Pic, 1901)
- Niponostenostola niponensis konoi (Kano, 1933)
- Niponostenostola niponensis pterocaryai (Hayashi, 1960)
